Pinoy Big Brother: Lucky Season 7, also known as Pinoy Big Brother: Lucky 7, is the seventh main season of the Philippine ABS-CBN reality television series Pinoy Big Brother and the thirteenth season overall. This is also the third special edition of Pinoy Big Brother because it featured celebrities, teens, and regular adults taking part in the same season. The show premiered on July 11, 2016 and lasted until March 5, 2017. Toni Gonzaga, Bianca Gonzalez and Robi Domingo reprised their roles as hosts. Mariel Rodriguez returned as host after her absence since Teen Clash 2010. During the season, Toni Gonzaga and Mariel Rodriguez took a maternity leave due to pregnancy. However, Gonzaga returned as a regular host when the Dream Team housemates entered the house. Maymay Entrata was the winner of this season.

The series is streaming online on YouTube.

Developments
The show announced its seventh season last March 30. On April 3, a Facebook page about Pinoy Big Brother posted a photo of the house and tells its audience to share it for a chance to be an official housemate. The Big Brother staff immediately disowned the promo as fake and reminds its social media followers to always verify their sources.

The official announcement for Lucky Season 7 aired on June 29. On July 2, 2016, during the airing of It's Showtime, Big Brother announced that the season will kick off with the entry of celebrity housemates. Other celebrity housemates were announced in various programs in the succeeding days.

During the transport of the celebrity housemates from the Philippines to Vietnam, three were barred from traveling by immigration officials due to problems with their visa and immigration cards; the three were able to travel the next day.

Auditions

Auditions started on May 21, 2016, and lasted until June 26, 2016. Like the previous two seasons, the auditions for regular and teen housemates were held together. Online auditions opened for overseas aspirants.

The following were the audition schedules. Note that, with the exception of the auditions held overseas, the first day is designated for teen auditions while the second day is designated for regular auditions:

Other content
Daily updates about upcoming episodes are shown twice a day. Pinoy Big Brother: Lucky Season 7 Online airs their episodes on the official website and on their official Facebook and YouTube page on weekdays, sometimes on weekends for after-eviction specials. For three weeks, during the stay of the celebrity housemates, a special show entitled PBB: Mga Kwento ng Celebrity Housemates (then formerly known as PBB Vietnam: Mga Kwento ng Celebrity Housemates when the latter was still in Vietnam) aired. It was then renamed to PBB: Mga Kwento ng Teen Housemates upon the arrival of the teen housemates, and PBB: Mga Kwento ng Housemates ni Kuya upon the teen and regular housemates lived in one house, and then renamed as PBB: Mga Kwento ng Dream Team ni Kuya when the Dream Team housemates entered. Online Bahay ni Kuya returned for viewers to participate and win PHP 100,000 at the end of its run.

On February 10, 2017, the show aired its final episode from Kapamilya Gold's afternoon and was replaced by Wildflower block called Pinoy Big Brother Lucky Season 7: Mga Kwentong Dream Team ni Kuya.

Overview
Like 737, this season is divided into batches. However a celebrity batch is added along with the teen and adult batches. The show kicked off with the celebrities. The teen housemates entered next, and the adults to follow last.

Episode format
For the celebrity batch, housemates have entered a week before the actual premiere, and so the broadcast for these episodes are delayed as opposed to the previous-day format that had been present since the first season. Since the show does not display a day number for each episode, it is assumed that events had happened a week from the actual air date. It is possible that the length of stay of the celebrity housemates is shorter than what is being aired. On July 30, 2016, the celebrity housemates returned to the Philippines to enter the Pinoy Big Brother House, and so the previous-day format returns.

For three weeks, the show only aired on weekdays due to the Grand Finals of We Love OPM. After their stint in Vietnam, their format went back to air episodes 7 days a week.

Changes
 Logo – For the first time since Unlimited, the show had a major logo change for this season. Having a minimalist look, the logo resembles that of the US and Canada versions while keeping the original Pinoy Big Brother typeface. They have also included a human eye instead of a graphical one that was seen in earlier seasons.
 House – For its first two weeks, the celebrity housemates were sent to the Big Brother House in Vietnam to complete the seven lucky tasks. On Day 17, housemates returned to the Pinoy Big Brother House. The House was inspired by the various scenery in the Philippines.
 Eviction – Evictions take place in a studio in ABS-CBN. Evicted housemates will transfer from the House going to the studio during the commercial break for an interview. Nominations and evictions can happen any day of the week. Ligtask challenges will determine the evicted housemates. Only when there are seven housemates left for each batch and the Dream Team starts, the public will be given the chance to vote.

Twists

 2-in-1 Housemate – Hashtags members McCoy de Leon and Nikko Natividad competed as one housemate.
 Lucky 7 Tasks – Housemates will undergo seven tasks, where different rewards can be won.
 Ligtask Challenges – Nominated housemates will undergo several challenges to save themselves from evictions. These will serve as an eviction process for the nominated housemates. Excluding for celebrity batch, as soon as seven housemates remain for each batch and the Dream Team begins, this will serve as challenges where one of the nominated housemates will be saved from eviction.
 Ligtas Pares Challenges - Pairs will undergo series of Ligtask challenges to save themselves from evictions. The bottom two pairs will face the public vote.
 Big Jump Challenge – Housemates participate in a series of challenges to get a spot to the finale.
 #PBBPadaluck – This hashtag serves as a help for the nominated housemates in their Ligtask challenges. The nominated housemate who gets the most tweets in Twitter involving this hashtag will be given an advantage on the Ligtask. This will end once the lucky seven housemates are complete. This resumes during special tasks for the Dream Team housemates.
 Positive Nominations - Instead of voting to nominate a housemate to evict, housemates will nominate whom they want to save. Housemates receiving the highest nomination points will be saved from nomination. This was carried from the previous season.
 Wildcard Housemate – An evicted housemate will have a chance to come back on the roster of housemates. However, unlike in previous seasons, selected evicted housemates will participate in challenges for the wild card spot.
 Dream Team – Twelve housemates from different batches will compete to become a winner. 4 lucky stars were given to 4 celebrities, 4 lucky suns to 4 teens, and 4 lucky houses to 4 regular adults which made up into one team.
 Dream House Challenge – Housemates will compete to win a dream house.
 Overnight Voting - In some eviction nights, people will only be given 24 hours to vote for their favorite housemate.
 Dream Team Challenges - Remaining Dream Team housemates will be given several challenges. If they win the required number of challenges, seven housemates will be in the Big Night.
 Seven Minute Voting Period - The public will be given 7 minutes only to vote for their favorite housemate.
 Back-to-back Nomination and Eviction – The nomination and eviction will happen on the same day.
 Lucky 7 – Seven housemates advance to the Big Night, competing for the title of the season's Big Winner

Housemates

Celebrities
Before the housemates of each batch officially entered the House, they were introduced in different ABS-CBN programs. They are officially introduced to the show's audience come the night of the show's launch.

From July 2 until July 4, five of the nine celebrity housemates were introduced with the first being two-in-one housemates, the first of its kind since Celebrity Edition 2. They were officially introduced during a live online show on the evening of July 4. As the online show was cut abruptly, events after the show were reported the following days, that the celebrity housemates flew to Vietnam and live in the Vietnamese Big Brother house. This season marks the first time a number of housemates were officially introduced a week before the official premiere. Four more celebrity housemates were revealed on July 6, 2016.

Teens
The first teen housemate, who was chosen by the celebrity housemates, entered on August 5, 2016. Five male teen housemates entered on August 6, 2016. Six female teen housemates entered the following day.

Adults
Seven adult housemates entered on Day 108. The last three Adult housemates entered on Day 112.

Housemates competing as one are coded with blue colors.

Dream Team
On Day 145, Big Brother announced his Dream Team, 12 housemates from different batches will be competing to be the winner.

Houseguests
The first houseguest from the celebrity batch is Thuy Nguyen, who was born in the Philippines, whose parents is Vietnamese. She participated with the celebrity batch on a series of tasks; more details are available on the Tasks section. Since the Celebrity Housemates succeeded in six tasks; Thuy is declared a regular housemate. Thuy left on Day 16 and has returned for the regular batch on Day 108. Jerome Ponce entered the House on Day 19.

For the teen batch, celebrity housemates JK Labajo, McCoy de Leon, and Elisse Joson entered the House on Day 27. Lola Pina entered on Day 40 as part of the housemates' third Lucky task. On Day 51, celebrity housemates Nikko Natividad and Nonong Ballinan entered the house to accompany the teen housemates on their 5th Lucky Task. On Day 58, Kathryn Bernardo and Daniel Padilla entered the house. On Day 65, Hashtags members, Jameson Blake, Jimboy Martin, McCoy de Leon, Nikko Natividad, Tom Doromal, and Zeus Collins entered the house to accompany the teen housemates on their second weekly task. Liza Soberano entered on that same day and Enrique Gil entered on Day 67. On Day 72, Alex Gonzaga and Joseph Marco entered as hotel guests. On Day 73, Miho Nishida re-entered with her child daughter Aimi, and Tommy Esguerra. On Day 80, two Brazilian models, Maria Fabiana and Stephanie Vaz, entered the House. During the Miss Teen Big Brother 2016 week, Precious Lara Quigaman entered the House to guide Kisses, Maymay, and Vivoree in the task. Angel Locsin, Zanjoe Marudo and Sam Milby also entered the house during the army training task.

For the regular batch, Angelica Panganiban entered the house on Day 118 to help them with their 1st lucky task. Tanner's twin, Tyler entered on Day 132 to help the housemates with their Jenga task. Celebrity housemates Elisse, Hideo, Nonong, and Yassi re-entered the House for the Comedy sketch weekly task.

Summary of events
Note that Day 1 started on July 5 upon the entry of the first five celebrity housemates in the Vietnamese Big Brother House. The official premiere of the show was on July 11 (Day 7). The celebrity housemates left Vietnam on July 20 (Day 16); thereafter, they temporarily return to the outside world. They returned to the Pinoy Big Brother House on July 30; note that the show's official website designated the day they have returned as Day 17.

Celebrities
On Day 0, Jinri, JK, McCoy, Nikko, and Yassi were introduced as the first five celebrity housemates. As part of the season's twist, they were flown to Ho Chi Minh City, Vietnam on Day 1; however, only McCoy, Nikko and Yassi were only able to depart as Jinri, JK and Hideo (only introduced later in TV Patrol) had visa and immigration card issues. After arriving in Vietnam, McCoy, Nikko and Yassi then entered the Vietnamese Big Brother House along with Chacha, Elisse and Nonong (only introduced later in TV Patrol). Two Vietnamese actors and Thuy entered the House after finishing a task in the outside world; they pretended that they were the current occupants and were the last three housemates of Big Brother Vietnam. On Day 2, Jinri, JK and Hideo were able to resolve the issues and were able to fly to Vietnam; the three entered the House that morning, while being chained and blindfolded. Due to this, the housemates had to unchain them within 30 minutes using the correct 3 keys among the 77 keys scattered around the House; they were successful. On Day 3, Thuy returned; in order to secure her spot as a regular housemate, she was tasked to pretend that she had won Big Brother Vietnam, that she has to temporarily stay as a house guest, and that she has to help them in their special task.

On Day 10, Hideo, Jinri, Yassi and JK were nominated. On Day 11, Chacha decided to voluntarily exit during their first eviction night; note that Hideo was supposedly the one to exit the House after having the poorest performance in the Ligtask challenge.

On Day 15, the housemates have won their 6th and last Lucky task; with this, Thuy revealed her true self. Jinri was temporarily allowed to leave the House due to reasons kept confidential; her exit was not considered as voluntary. In the morning of Day 16, Big Brother toured the housemates in the Mekong River. By the afternoon, after more than two weeks in Vietnam, Big Brother announced that they will be leaving the Vietnamese Big Brother House and will return to the Philippines.

On Day 17, with the exception of JK, the celebrity housemates entered the Pinoy Big Brother House. Later on, Big Brother revealed that only two of them dubbed as Lucky Stars will be able to continue their journey to reach the finale; he also told them that they will encounter many challenges determined by picking a ball among the other Bola ng Kapalaran placed inside a Big Tambiola. Yassi was tasked to choose the first ball; their first task was that they were only allowed to bring one luggage from eight luggage they have; they picked Nonong's luggage. After the entry of the housemates, disguised as a hooded face ninja, Jerome Ponce entered the House as a house guest in order to assist Big Brother in the housemates' challenges and to fix the thing between him and Elisse. On Day 18, Elisse picked the second ball which showed an image of a basket; the image would mean that they will get a basket of eggs, sweet potatoes and bitter gourds as their food. They had to ration it until Big Brother gives them another set of food supplies. Meanwhile, McCoy was informed by Big Brother that the hooded face ninja was Jerome and that he has to help bring him to their bedroom without the female housemates noticing them; he was allowed to tell the task and ask for help with the other male housemates.

On Day 19, McCoy and the other male housemates continued their task in hiding Jerome from the females. Later that day, the female housemates were blind-folded for 4 hours; this gave Jerome the opportunity to freely roam the House. JK returned to the House; he was introduced by Big Brother to Jerome in the Confession Room. He was also told about the male housemates' task. Later on, the still blind-folded female housemates entered the Confession Room one by one; they were tasked to identify JK and Jerome. Each of the female housemates perfectly identified JK; while Jerome was only identified by Elisse. Due to this, JK was able to enter the House; Jerome, who was not able to enter the House, was given the chance to write a letter to Elisse. After Elisse read the letter, she was given the decision whether she would be willing to talk with him. In the early hours of Day 20, she decided to talk and both were able to do so. Their conversation led to the closure to their failed relationship. On Day 22, Jinri won one of the two Lucky Stars granting her to continue in hopes of becoming the big winner of this season. On Day 23, McCoy & Nikko later were revealed to get the last Lucky Star and able to continue with Jinri. The non-finalist celebrity housemates later exited the House.

Teens
On Day 23, Maymay was introduced as the chosen Lucky Teen Housemate by the celebrity housemates after they won the Lucky 7 Tasks; she later entered the House ahead of the other teen housemates. On Day 24, Big Brother told the Lucky 2 celebrity housemates that they will temporarily be leaving the house on that day and will eventually return on a specified date. In that same day, the male teen housemates entered the house and together with Maymay, Big Brother gave their first task of balancing styroballs, each of which corresponded to a priced grocery item, while rolling it onto a series of planks until it reaches a grocery cart placed on the other side of the activity area. This task will determine their weekly food supply. The female teen housemates then entered the house on Day 25.

On Day 27, the teen housemates started their first lucky task, which turned out to be successful. On Day 30, former celebrity housemates, Elisse and McCoy entered the Big Brother house as house guests. This is to prepare the teen housemates for their SwerTeen Ball. The male teen housemates were asked to draw lots for their partner on the SwerTeen Ball, the aftermath left Kisses and Vivoree without one. So, they requested Big Brother to do significant roles for the ball; Kisses to host, and Vivoree for a song number. This was all concluded in the SwerTeen Ball on Day 32, the teen housemates showcased their talents and skills in singing, dancing, and playing instruments. Vivoree was greeted by a special guest, JK, to play her composition for the song number. Note that JK became a celebrity housemate as well.

On Day 33, a romantic date was set up for house guests McCoy and Elisse. The teen housemates' second lucky task occurred on Day 34. The passed task led to a family reunion for Rita. The 1st Teen Nomination Night was witnessed on Day 39, which left Aizan, Christian, and Kisses nominated. On Day 40, they were visited by an elderly woman, Lola Pina, from the Kanlungan ni Maria - Home for the Aged. This was in line with their third lucky task. The result of their task was a failure and it was revealed on Day 45.

Also on Day 43, the 1st Teen Eviction Night occurred. This left Aizan as the first evictee of the teen batch. On that same night, the housemates cast their nominations but it was announced the following night. On Day 44, the 2nd Teen Nomination Night immediately took place. In this particular week, Christian, Heaven, Kristine, and Rita were nominated. Their 4th Lucky Task was revealed on Day 45. On Day 47, Maymay temporarily left the house due to the death of her grandfather. On Day 48, Edward was visited by his father to inform him of his grandmother's passing. Later that night, a family reunion took place for Yong due to the success of their 4th Lucky Task.

On Day 49, Maymay returned to the house. Later that night, the 2nd Teen Eviction Night occurred making Rita the second evictee. The 3rd Teen Nomination Night immediately occurred the following day, Day 50, and Christian, Fenech, Heaven, Kisses, and Marco were nominated. On Day 51, former celebrity housemates Nikko Natividad and Nonong Ballinan entered the house to facilitate the teen housemates on their fifth lucky task, which also revealed on the same day. The teen housemates passed the task and as a bonus, the proceeds of their task will go to the alms for Maymay's grandfather, who died of a heart attack. On Day 56, Fenech got evicted on the 3rd Teen Eviction Night.

On Day 58, Kapamilya stars Kathryn Bernardo and Daniel Padilla entered the house. They, together with the teen housemates, imitated scenes from the duo's movie, Barcelona: A Love Untold. The 4th Teen Nomination Night happened four days after the 3rd Teen Eviction Night (Day 60), and Christian, Heaven, and Kisses, are nominated for the week.  Big Brother gave the nominees a condition wherein if they succeed their first-ever weekly task (Paliga ni Kuya), none of them will be put into threat for eviction, but if they fail, the eviction process will still continue.

The teen housemates failed their first weekly task and as a result, the eviction process for Christian, Heaven, and Kisses will still continue. On Day 64, Maymay, accompanied by Edward, went to Camiguin for her grandfather's burial. On Day 65, Hashtags members (Jameson Blake, Jimboy Martin, McCoy de Leon, Nikko Natividad, Tom Doromal, and Zeus Collins), who were once PBB housemates, entered the house to accompany the teen housemates on their second weekly task. On the same day, Kapamilya actress Liza Soberano entered the house as a houseguest and had an extraordinary date with the male teen housemates. On Day 67, Kapamilya actor Enrique Gil entered the house and had a memorable date with Maymay, who the latter is her ultimate celebrity crush.

On Day 70, Heaven decided to make a voluntary exit, due to her mother's wish to see to her as she recovers from a brain operation. This made Christian and Kisses safe from eviction. On Day 71, the teen housemates participated in Hashtags': The Road Trip Concert. To pass the weekly task, they must earn 70% of the approval of the audience. After the performance, they learned of the result in which they got 94% of the audience's approval; this made them pass their second weekly task. On the same day, the 5th Teen Nomination Night occurred, and Christian, Kristine, and Vivoree were nominated for eviction.

On Day 72, Big Brother announced their third weekly task wherein the housemates became hotel personnel in the PBB Hotel. Celebrities, Alex Gonzaga, Joseph Marco, and former housemates Tommy Esguerra, Miho Nishida and her daughter Aimi were the house guests in the PBB Hotel. With the help of Marco's mother, they passed their weekly task.

On Day 77, the 5th Teen Eviction Night occurred and Kristine got evicted in the house. The next day, Kuya proposed an international pageant called Miss Teen Big Brother 2016 as their fourth weekly task. The following, Kisses, Maymay, and Vivoree are the contestants. In Day 80, two Brazilian models, Maria Fabiana and Stephanie Vaz, entered the house as house players for the pageant. The pageant was held on Day 84 but it was aired for 3 days. Maria won the pageant which resulted in the failure of their fourth weekly task.

On Day 87, the housemates had their face-to-face nomination, which resulted in Kisses, Marco and Vivoree being nominated for that week. On Day 88, their 6th lucky task was revealed which made the teen housemates undergo army training. Their task occurred outside the house and it resulted in a success. On Day 92, Marco left the house on the 6th Teen Eviction Night.

On Day 94, the teen housemates had their second face-to-face nomination resulting in Kisses, Vivoree and Yong being nominated. On Day 96, the remaining housemates started their 7th and final lucky task. On Day 97, Big Brother announced the Big Jump Challenge and only three housemates can participate. Christian and Yong chose to participate in the challenge and the remaining housemates continued with their 7th lucky task. On Day 98, Vivoree was evicted on the 7th Teen Eviction Night.

On Day 100, their last weekly task was announced which they later on passed. On that same day, Edward won the third flag making him the last challenger on the Big Jump Challenge. On Day 102, Christian, Edward, and Yong faced an inquiry wherein they answered a series of questions asked by their fellow housemates, ex-housemates and from social media. This inquiry will be a great help on their Big Jump Challenge.

On Day 104, the Big Jump Challenge occurred which resulted to Edward getting the first lucky sun.

Adults
On Day 105, the first seven Adult housemates entered the house. They started their first day in the activity area which was set-up as a cemetery. Their first task was given that day—the first six Adults must work together to find the keys hidden in the cemetery to free Tanner, the seventh adult housemate, who was mummified by the teen housemates, from being chained and locked. On Day 109, the adult housemates were able to finally enter the house with the help from the remaining teen housemates.

On Day 110, they started their first weekly task, which turned out to be successful and as a bonus, the adult housemates were able to give the remaining teen housemates, ₱10,000 each as a Christmas gift. On Day 112, international vocal trio, SWV entered the house as house guests. Later that night, Christian, with the lowest percentage of votes, got evicted from the PBB House on the 8th Teen Eviction Night. The last three Adult housemates, Aura, Jesi, and Wil entered the house on that same night but was not introduced yet to the housemates inside the house. On that same night, Jesi was also given a secret task which is to hide his identity.

On Day 113, Aura was able to meet the housemates inside the house. On Day 114, their first lucky task was revealed. The remaining teen housemates went to Baguio to buy the clothes needed on their task. Also on that same day, Jesi entered the house as PJ, to hide his identity with the housemates. On Day 115, Wil met the housemates and he announced that Big Brother will have a pool party. On Day 117, the teen housemates returned to the Big Brother house.

On Day 118, celebrity actress, Angelica Panganiban entered the house as a houseguest to give some advice with their lucky task. On Day 119, Jesi revealed his true identity granting him immunity from the first adult nomination. On Day 120, Big Brother announced that the housemates passed their first lucky task and later that night, with the highest percentage of votes, Kisses took the 2nd lucky sun leaving Maymay and Yong fighting for the 3rd lucky sun through public voting.

On Day 122, their second lucky task was revealed. On Day 123, Ali and Tanner were given an outside task to become a garbage collector to collect more bottles needed for their lucky task. On Day 124, Ali, Cora, Tanner and Wil went to Payatas to collect more bottles. Later that day, due to Ali's success on her secret task, she was able to see her long lost sister, Lea. On Day 125, Big Brother announced that the housemates passed their second lucky task and later that night, with the highest percentage of votes, Maymay took the 3rd lucky sun making Yong the last evictee for their batch. The last three teens temporarily bid farewell to the adult housemates on Day 126 and will eventually return soon.

On Day 127, the 1st Adult Nomination Night occurred and Cora, Luis, Thuy at Wil was the first set of nominees for their batch. On Day 129, the housemates became superheroes for their weekly task. On Day 131, due to Wil's success on his secret task, Luis was able to hear his father's voice after a long time. On Day 132, Luis set up a Thanksgiving dinner for Wil and his family in the United States. Later that day Tanner's twin, Tyler, entered the house and was given a secret task to switch places with Tanner as a housemate without the other housemates noticing.

On Day 133, the 1st Adult Eviction Night occurred, and with the least time to finish the Ligtask Challenge, Thuy, left the house. On Day 136, the Double Trouble Challenge started, wherein the adult housemates were split into two teams: the Red Team (Ali, Cora, Jesi, Luis, and Wil) and the Blue Team (Aura, Baninay, Jerome, Tanner, and Tyler). They must win two out of the three Double Trouble Challenges to gain immunity from nomination, while the losing team will face nomination, and two members from their team will get evicted. The Red Team won the first challenge (Sumo Wars), while the Blue Team won the last two challenges (Rubik's Cube Tower and Tensyon Trouble). This, then, makes the Blue Team immune from nomination, and the Red Team to face eviction.

At the same time, Big Brother also gave them their fourth and fifth lucky tasks, which is to only have 16 hours of sleep in a span of five days. They won both tasks. On Day 147, house guest Tyler left the house. On Day 145, a special Double Eviction occurred, and Jesi and Ali got evicted from the house after gaining the lengthiest time from their Ligtask Challenge. After this, the remaining adult housemates were hereby proclaimed as the Lucky 7 Adult Housemates.

As a result of the adult housemates' victory of winning five lucky tasks, they will now be able to pass their luck. And this luck is the ultimate twist of the season, the Dream Team. They are a set of 12 lucky housemates who will onwards compete for the title of becoming the Big Winner of the season. They are composed of the Lucky Celebrity Stars and the Lucky Teen Suns. Having been filled with 5 out of the 12 slots, the next member will come from the lucky celebrity housemates. Thus, their fifth win will result on to pass their luck to a lucky celebrity housemate (Elisse, Hideo, Nonong, and Yassi). Unfortunately, due to prior commitments, JK is disqualified from the twist.

On Day 154, Wil, Aura, and Luis were nominated in a positive face-to-face nomination that occurred. Aura eventually won the ligtask challenge. Also, Big Brother announced that there will be only an overnight voting and the one who will get the lowest votes will be evicted. On Day 155, Luis was evicted from the house.

On Day 169, Tanner got the first lucky house after winning the Big Jump Challenge. On Day 173, Baninay and Wil were transferred to a white isolated room with a red buzzer that they can press to give up their chance for the third lucky house and automatically voluntary exiting. They had to do different tasks to get food and other necessities. On Day 171, Aura got the second lucky house after receiving the highest percentage of text votes. As a result, Cora and Jerome were also transferred to the white room. They left the white room on Day 172. On Day 174, the lucky seven teen housemates were asked of who would they pick to be the third lucky house after reviewing several challenges the regulars faced. Jerome eventually got the third lucky house after having more votes from the teens than Cora, Wil, and Baninay, who were evicted.

Dream Team
On Day 175, the 3 lucky stars— Jinri, 2-in-1 housemates, McCoy and Nikko, Nonong and the 3 lucky suns— Edward, Kisses, and Maymay re-entered the Big Brother house. Big Brother also announced that he would pick the two recipients of a wildcard slot for each batch. On Day 176, Elisse, Christian, Yong, Cora, and Baninay re-entered the house for a chance to enter the dream team. Yassi followed them the next day. They would face each other in a challenge to determine the fourth lucky star, sun, and house. On Day 177, Yassi gained the fourth lucky star after winning their challenge against Elisse by having the fastest time. On Day 178, Yassi entered the main house again but eventually decided to leave and pass her "luck" or spot in the Dream Team to Elisse due to her prior commitments. Elisse entered the house again and gained the fourth lucky star.

Tasks

Lucky 7 tasks
On July 8, it was announced that the celebrity housemates will do seven tasks in Vietnam, with then house guest Thuy Nguyen. If they pass six out of seven tasks, Thuy will be an adult housemate for the next batch; if they pass five out of seven, the celebrity housemates can pick a teen auditionee to become an official teen housemate for the next batch. Sometimes, these serve as weekly tasks.

The teen housemates were also given seven lucky tasks. If they pass five out of seven tasks, they will have a chance to pick an adult housemate for the next batch. If they pass six out of seven, there will be three finalists instead of two. Their first five tasks also served as their weekly tasks, after which they did regular weekly tasks until the Lucky 7 housemates were formed.

The adult housemates were also given seven lucky tasks. If they pass five out of seven, they'll be able to pass their luck to one of the lucky celebrity housemates.

  Chacha was still in the House when the task was performed. The episode for this task aired on July 25, 2016. The celebrity housemates only received 97 bamboo cards.
   The teen housemates made Nanay Pina laugh for about 51 minutes only.

Weekly tasks
For the teens, adults, and Dream Team housemates, Big Brother gave regular weekly tasks, which had no bearing to the Lucky 7 tasks.

Challenges

Ligtask
The evictee will be determined by participating in a challenge. The nominee who loses the challenges becomes evicted. While the public cannot vote to save the nominees until seven housemates are left, they can give an advantage to one nominee by using Twitter hashtags given by the show. The nominee with the highest hashtag count will be given an advantage for their challenge. This rule did not apply to the celebrity housemates. From the Lucky 7 housemates in each batch except Celebrity batch, nominated housemates had to compete in challenges in order to save themselves from eviction. In case of ties, no one will be saved.

  Chacha opted for a voluntary exit; Hideo, consequently, became safe.
  The columns in red are still the pre-Lucky 7 Teens, while those in yellow are already the Lucky 7 Teens.
  The columns in red are still the pre-Lucky 7 adults, while those in yellow are already the Lucky 7 Adults.

Big Jump Challenge
Housemates had to participate in various challenges in order to continue and fight the journey to reach the finale. Highlighted in green are the Big Jump Challenge winners.

Double Trouble Challenge
On Day 139, it was announced that the adult housemates will undergo a Double Trouble task wherein they will be divided into two teams. They will compete each other on series of challenges. The team with most wins will be saved from double eviction while the other team will be nominated. They will also have 2-in-1 lucky task during the double trouble week.

4th Lucky Spot Challenge
On Day 179, Big Brother announced that there will be 3 more additional spots on the Dream Team. He decided who among the evicted housemate per batch will have a chance to become a finalist again. He selected 2 housemates per batch and only 1 housemate will become a member of the Dream Team. It would be Yassi vs. Elisse for celebrities, Christian vs. Yong for teens and Cora vs. Baninay for the adults.

  Yassi gave up her spot due to prior commitments outside so Elisse took the 4th lucky star.

Dream House Challenge
On Day 198, Big Brother announced that the housemate will compete against each other to win a dream house worth almost ₱2 million. Each housemate was asked if they want to compete. All housemates except Edward, Kisses and McCoy  accepted the challenge.

  Only one from McCoy and Nikko can compete in the Dream House challenge because they're a 2-in-1 housemate.

Padalucks for Special Challenges
The public were given a chance to help their favorite housemates on their special challenges by using the hashtag #PADALUCK. The housemate who gets the most mentions in Twitter involving this hashtag will be given an advantage on their challenge.

Dream Team Challenge
On Day 213, Big Brother announced that instead of Big 4, there might be Lucky 7 housemates who will continue the Big Night if they will pass 3 out of 5 Dream Team Challenges.

Nomination history

In every nomination, each housemate has to nominate two people with the first receiving two points and the second with one point. As the celebrity housemates entered the House a week before the official premiere of the show, nomination and eviction dates that happened in Vietnam will reflect the days a week from the actual air date. On Day 17, celebrity housemates went back to the Philippines, and the dates presented from this day onward will reflect dates when nominations and evictions were aired.

As a new format for evictions, Ligtask challenges will be the basis for evicting housemates. Only when the House is down to seven housemates for each batch will the public be given the chance to vote.

Celebrity housemates

Notes
  Only one spot is given for the winner of the Big Jump challenge; the other spot is given to the housemates who had received the highest number of public votes. For the results of the Big Jump challenges, see Big Jump Lucky 2 Stars Challenge. 
  Elisse, Hideo, Nonong and Yassi were nominated to be the 3rd Lucky Star, which will be chosen by the regular housemates as a reward of winning 5 lucky tasks. JK was not able to take part due to his prior commitments.
  Yassi won the 4th Lucky Star challenge. Due to her prior commitments, she will not be able to join the Dream team. She passed the 4th lucky star spot to Elisse.

Teen housemates

Notes
  The housemates didn't pass the weekly task Paliga ni Kuya. Because of this, the eviction will still occur. see Weekly tasks.
  All housemates were up for eviction. However, Big Brother implemented a Ligtask Challenge so the three will be saved from eviction while the other three will be facing the public vote. Edward topped the Ligtask challenge by having the least balls.

Adult housemates

Notes
  Tanner, Wil, Ali, and Cora were punished for violating some house rules. They were asked to pick a ball inside a tambiolo. Each ball corresponds to either 1 point or 2 points, and whatever points they get will be added to their nomination points. Tanner and Ali got 1 additional point, while Wil and Cora got 2 more points.
  Aura and Tanner are not allowed to participate on their 7th Lucky Task because they will be competing for the Big Jump Challenge
  Because the housemates succeeded in their 7th Lucky Task, Baninay, Cora, Jerome, and Wil will no longer face the upcoming eviction.

Dream Team

Legend

The Big Night
The Big Night for this season was held at the Alonte Sports Arena in Biñan, Laguna from March 4–5, 2017 (Days 234 & 235).

On Day 234, before going to the venue, the housemates were given a surprise interview by the hosts of It's Showtime. They were transported into a truck that drove them into the venue, blindfolded. An opening production number was spearheaded by most of the Lucky Ex-housemates, together with Alex Gonzaga (the show's longest-staying houseguest), Tommy Esguerra (737 2nd Big Placer) and Big Winners Daniel Matsunaga and Miho Nishida, which were held inside the arena and a stage set outside. After which, Big Brother gave his final message to his Lucky 7, who were situated in a green room depicting an augmented reality of a castle hall in an interdimensional plane (the first in the season to do so) and a skit was performed by the contestants of Your Face Sounds Familiar Kids, Niño Muhlach, together with mainstay hosts Toni Gonzaga and Robi Domingo, highlighting some of the best moments of the show's longest edition.

Just like the 737 season, the 7-day open voting was closed and the first set of announcements were made. Cora Waddell, Nikko Natividad & McCoy de Leon, and Tanner Mata were named the 7th to 5th Lucky Big Placers respectively. The voting tally ended up very narrow with the top-gainer edging the closest contender less than one percent (0.62% to be exact). It was reset to zero after they announced the Dream Team Big 4 and voting will open tomorrow night.
 
The table shows the final tally of votes prior to the first set of announcements and note that the codes per housemate reflect that they are a Lucky Housemate (L, U, C, K, Y, H, M) 

On Day 235, the show began with a production number with Gonzaga. Like yesterday, the Lucky Big 4 were then transported on separated vehicles to the venue. After this, the voting lines were re-opened and voting for the Big Winner was done in a span of 30 minutes (with the arrangement of the housemates changed to L, U, C, and K). While this is ongoing, the Lucky Big 4 were tasked to ask questions to their respective housemates, highlighting some of the important moments in the season. After that, the voting lines were then closed and two events happened after: an interview with the 5th-7th Lucky Big Placers and a production number from 737 alumnus Zeus Collins, 737 4th Big Placer Dawn Chang, Lucky 7 celebrity housemate Yassi Pressman and the show's first Teen Big Winner Kim Chiu.

Chiu and Garcia then accompanied Gonzaga in announcing the 4th and 3rd Big Placers respectively, with Edward Barber and Yong Muhajil garnering those placings. After which, the final 2 were named and the announcements for their fate were made with the director of the show and head of TV production Lauren Dyogi, and head of broadcast Cory Vidanes. Kisses Delavin was named the 2nd Big Placer while Maymay Entrata was announced the 14th Big Winner of the show.

Mariel Rodriguez was noticeably absent in the show due to her maternity leave. The table below shows the final breakdown of the votes.

References

External links
 Pinoy Big Brother Official website

Pinoy Big Brother seasons
2016 Philippine television seasons
2017 Philippine television seasons
Television shows filmed in Vietnam